Paul Smith (September 21, 1921 – June 25, 2007) was an American typewriter artist.

Biography

Smith was born in 1921 in Philadelphia, Pennsylvania. He suffered from severe spastic cerebral palsy from an early age. The loss of fine motor control of his face and hands made it impossible for him to attend school—or even eat, clothe, or bathe himself—and also made it difficult for him to express himself. 

Paul never married and had no children. In 1967 he entered the retirement facility Rose Haven in Roseburg Oregon.

See also
Typewriter
ASCII art

References

External links
https://web.archive.org/web/20071020155210/http://oregonnews.com/article/20070628/NEWS/70628031/ Obituary and more information
Typewriter Artist - 2004 KING-TV story

1921 births
2007 deaths
20th-century American artists